Scorpaenopsis altirostris is a species of venomous marine ray-finned fish belonging to the family Scorpaenidae, the scorpionfishes. This species is found in the Eastern Central Pacific Ocean.

Size

References

altirostris
Taxa named by Charles Henry Gilbert
Fish described in 1905